This is a list of characters in the Asterix comics.

Main characters
Asterix, Obelix and Dogmatix are the first characters with short descriptions usually listed at the beginning of each of the Asterix books (after the map of Gaul). They each have separate articles containing more information. Unless otherwise stated, this article uses the names chosen for the English translations of the books.

Asterix

Asterix is the main character. He is a brave, intelligent and shrewd warrior of somewhat diminutive size, who eagerly volunteers for all perilous missions.
As the titular character, he is usually the star of the story. His name is usually left unchanged in translations, aside from accents and the use of local alphabets: for example, in Esperanto, Polish, Slovene, Latvian and Turkish it is Asteriks, although in Turkish he was previously named Bücür, meaning "shorty" 
In Icelandic, he is known as Ástríkur ("Rich of love").
In Sinhala,  could be interpreted as 'heroic grandfather'.

Obelix

Obelix is Asterix's closest friend and works as a menhir sculptor and delivery man. He is a tall, obese man (he refers to himself as "well-padded" or "man with a slipped chest" and will immediately knock out anyone who calls him "fat") with two notable attributes: his permanently phenomenal strength and his voracious appetite for food, especially wild boar. His strength results from having fallen into Getafix's magic potion cauldron as a baby. As a consequence, Getafix will not let him take additional potions for fear of side effects (for example, turning into stone, as shown in Asterix and Obelix all at Sea), something that Obelix finds immensely unfair. The only exception was in Asterix and Cleopatra when they were trapped in a pyramid and Getafix allows him to have three drops of the magic potion. Obelix's size is often the brunt of many jokes. In Asterix and the Big Fight, the druid Psychoanalytix mistakes Obelix for a patient with an eating disorder. At the end of the book, Obelix decides to go on a diet, but quickly goes back to eating huge quantities of boar.

 French: Obélix: meaning either obélisque "obelisk", a massive monument, or the typographical symbol (†) (also called an obelus in English and "obèle" French) which is sometimes used to indicate a second footnote if the first footnote is indicated by an asterisk. His name is also almost never changed in official translations (not counting orthographical variations such as Obeliks in e.g. Esperanto, Polish and Slovene).
 In Icelandic, his name is Steinríkur, roughly meaning "rich in stone", due to Obelix's fascination with stones.
 Early Turkish editions called him Hopdediks, after , which is a phrase uttered when someone overdoes something. In more recent albums he is Oburiks, after , which means "gluttonous".
 In Sinhala he is called ජිම් පප්පා (Jim Pappa)

Dogmatix

First appearance: Asterix and the Banquet (book 5 in France).
Dogmatix is Obelix's pet dog. Unlike his immense master, Dogmatix is very tiny, but he can have a nasty temper. Dogmatix loves nature and hates to see trees suffer. (Obelix once mentions that this is because Dogmatix likes to urinate on them.) Dogmatix met Asterix and Obelix in Lutetia (in Asterix and the Banquet) and followed them all the way around Gaul until Obelix finally noticed him when they reached the village and Dogmatix barked behind him. Since then, Obelix has become very affectionate toward Dogmatix. In Asterix and the Chieftain's Shield, Obelix gets angry with hungry people who try to take Dogmatix's bone and insists they will be punished if they try to take advantage of his dog. Dogmatix is relatively intelligent, and is particularly good as a hunting dog.  His most noteworthy moments were rescuing Asterix, Obelix and Getafix from entrapment in Cleopatra, finding the captured Asterix in Great Crossing, and locating the much needed desert petroleum in Black Gold.

  (Idée fixe, a "fixed idea" or "obsession", also a "prejudice"). Most translations use some variant of this original name (e.g. Ideafix in Spanish, Idefiks in Esperanto and Polish, and İdefiks in Turkish).
In Danish, German, Swedish, Dutch, Norwegian, Finnish and Polish, Idefix
In English, Dogmatix comes from dogmatic — clinging to an unchanging set of beliefs. The pun is extended because the name also contains the word "dog".
Hindi — In the मधु मुस्कान (Madhu Muskan) translations, Dogmatix has been called Kutta Bhaunkix ("the dog who barks")
In Bengali, he is known as Gnoyartumix (গোঁয়ার্তুমিক্স) — compare the Bengali term , which means "being dogmatic".
In Croatian, he is known as Snupix (reference to Snoopy) and Fidofiks, and in newest translation as Malix ("the little one").
In Hebrew, מבריקס (Mavrix), from mavrik, "bright, clever".
In Hungarian, it is Mirnixdirnix (quickly, immediately; a German loan from mir nichts dir nichts), Töpszlix which refers to his small size, or Idefix, ca. "here for sure" referring to fetching.
In Greek early translations, he was called Katrulix (Κατρουλίξ) meaning "he who pees himself". However, this was considered too demeaning by the readers, and thus was changed to Idefix (Ιντεφίξ)
In Portuguese, Ideiafix, a Portuguese variation (Ideia Fixa) of the original French name
In Italian — Idefix but in the movie Asterix and Cleopatra he is called Ercolino ("Little Hercules")
In Icelandic — Krílríkur

Major recurring characters
At the beginning of most of the Asterix books, immediately after the map of Gaul, and before the narrative starts, there is a standard description of the main characters above, as well as Getafix, Cacofonix and Vitalstatistix (regardless of their importance in that particular book).

The first appearance of all the major characters is in Asterix the Gaul unless otherwise noted. Notes are given for languages which have translations of 90% or more of the albums — primarily European languages along with Brazilian Portuguese. (Indonesian also falls in this category, but it leaves the French names unchanged. Languages which do not use the "x" (such as those of Eastern Europe like Polish, Baltic languages, Bulgarian and Esperanto) substitute "ks" in translations; "c" is also not used in some (such as Polish, Greek and Basque) which substitute "k" or "z" for hard and soft "c" respectively in names that are otherwise unaltered.

Getafix

Getafix is the village druid. In appearance, he is tall with a long white beard, hooked nose, white robe, red cloak. He is usually seen in possession of a small golden sickle. While his age is never stated, in the story of Asterix's birth (in which all but the oldest villagers are seen as small children), he appears unchanged. In Asterix and the Big Fight, the druid Psychoanalytix (who appears quite old) refers to him as his elder and teacher. In Asterix and Obelix's Birthday: The Golden Book, as a gag, Getafix at 50 years older appears to be frail and old, while in the other books, he appeared healthy.

Although known for his strength-enhancing magic potion, he has many other magical and medicinal potions at his disposal, including a potion to make hair grow quickly, a potion to counteract poison, one that neutralizes a drug that would kill in a matter of days, and a potion that restores a person to full health after injury (although this potion also causes the person who takes it to lose their recent memories while also interacting badly with the magic potion). Aside from making the potion, he also acts as the village doctor and occasional teacher. Asterix (and most other villagers) will consult him whenever anything strange occurs. He does not normally engage himself in combat, whereas most of the villagers enjoy a good punch-up (even with each other). One exception is one of the stories explaining Gaulish women, using Mrs. Geriatrix as an example, in which he involves himself in a fight sparked by Impedimenta. The final cut is shown with all the male villagers and two females, Impedimenta and Bacteria included, with Getafix running to stop the fight, with a piece of fish flying towards him. His most notable brawl is when, masquerading as a cook in The Great Divide, he makes and partakes of the magic potion (passing it off as soup) to free the enslaved men from the divided village, captured by the Romans — and doing a test run on the slaves who were present — and then starts distributing slaps with obvious enjoyment.

As the only individual able to produce the "magic potion" upon which the villagers rely for their strength, he is the focus of many stories, ranging from the Romans attempting to put him out of commission in some manner to requesting that Asterix and Obelix help him find some missing ingredient, and the conscience of the village. On a few occasions, he has refused to make the potion when the villagers become too selfish, including in Asterix and Caesar's Gift, where he refused to provide the potion for anyone while the village was divided by an upcoming vote for a new chief, only to provide them with it once again when Vitalstatistix asked Getafix to provide the potion for Orthopedix, the man he had been running against for chief. He has also occasionally been taken prisoner by hostile forces to get access to the potion, only to be freed again thanks to Asterix and Obelix. The full recipe of the magic potion itself has never been revealed, but known ingredients are mistletoe (which must be cut with a golden sickle [Asterix and the Golden Sickle]), a whole lobster (an optional ingredient that improves the flavour), fresh fish, salt, and petroleum (called rock oil in the book), which is later replaced by beetroot juice. Replenishing the stores of ingredients for the magic potion has led to some adventures for Asterix and Obelix, including Asterix and the Great Crossing and Asterix and the Black Gold.

Getafix is very similar to many wise old men who act as mentors and father-figures to the heroes, such as Merlin or Gandalf. In the earlier books however, Getafix came across more as just a friend of the protagonists rather than a wise old counselor. He was also, from the very beginning, shown as a figure of fun and had a wonderful sense of humour: in Asterix the Gaul, he keeps cutting his finger while using his sickle and roars with uncontrollable laughter at Asterix's teasing of the Roman Centurion; in Asterix and the Big Fight, he was shown as going literally crazy; and he's not above making the occasional bad pun (such as in Asterix and the Great Divide, when one of the village's frequent "stale fish" fights prompts him to observe that the villagers may soon discover nuclear "fish-ion").

French and Dutch: Panoramix (From Hellenic/Greek Πανόραμα/Panorama which means wide view, Πανοραμίξ/Panoramix or "he who sees everything"). This name is used in most European translations, including Bulgarian, Dutch, Italian, Latin, Polish, Portuguese, Slovene, Serbian, Catalan, Spanish, Indonesian, Czech, Slovak, Greek, Asturian and Romanian.
In English, the name is a pun on "getting a fix" — obtaining a dose of a recreational drug, and a reference to the magic potion he produces; the phrase can also mean to perceive or to get a solid sense of something. In the short-lived American version of the series, he was called Magigimmix ("magic gimmicks"). He was called Readymix (the name of a British cement firm) in newspaper comics during the 1970s, as Getafix was considered inappropriate for children. In the English version of the Asterix the Gaul film, he is referred to by his original French name of Panoramix and in the American dub of the Asterix and the Big Fight film he is called Vitamix.
In German, Swedish, Danish and Norwegian, he is known as Miraculix, from Latin miraculum (miracle).
In Serbian, he is known as Аспириникс (Aspiriniks), from the drug Aspirin. Also in certain translations is known as Панорамикс (Panoramiks).
In the newest translation it is Faktorix.
In Finnish, he is Akvavitix, from "akvavit", a Scandinavian distilled beverage (derived from Aqua vitae).
In West Frisian, his name is Crudemix, "Cruden" being herbs and spices, his name thus means "Spice mix".
In Hindi, he is हकीम वैधिक्स (Hakeem Vaidhix), Hindi for a "village doctor".
In Hungarian, he is Magicoturmix, which is a composition of "magic" and "shake", thus meaning "Shake of Magic". Actually, this is a reference to the potion he is brewing, which gives the villagers their wondrous superhuman strength.
In Bengali, he is Etashetamix (এটাসেটামিক্স), meaning "mix this and that".
In Icelandic, he is Sjóðríkur, roughly meaning "one who boils". In comparison, Asterix is Ástríkur, "one who loves".
In Hebrew, אשפיקס (Ashafix), meaning "master of the craft".
In Welsh, he is Crycymalix, a pun on the phrase , which means "arthritis" or "rheumatism", referring to his old age.
In Sinhala —  which means a "druid" or "witch".
In Malaysia, the English version that was released in the newspapers, he was "Medix" due to the strict laws in the country against drug abuse.
In Russian, he is Починикс (Pochinix), meaning "he who repairs things". The name was translated from the English version, not the French, but the pun about "getting a fix" was lost in translation. However, the druid is named "Панорамикс" ("Panoramix") in all live-action films and Asterix: The Mansions of the Gods.
In Scots, he is named Kensawthetrix, meaning "knows all the tricks".
In Turkish, he is named Büyüfiks, from "büyü" the Turkish word for "magic".

Vitalstatistix

Chief Vitalstatistix is the chief of the Gaulish village. He is a middle-aged, bigbellied man with red hair, pigtails and a huge moustache. He is generally reasonable, well-informed, fearless, (comparatively) even-tempered and unambitious — the last much to the chagrin of his wife Impedimenta. His major failings are his love of good food and drink (it is unlikely to be a coincidence that his wife is the best cook in the village) — which has led to health problems — and his pride. As a Gaulish chief, he prefers to travel on a shield, carried by two shield-bearers. A recurring joke throughout the series is him falling off the shield in many varied ways. The names of the shield-bearers are never mentioned.

Vitalstatistix fought at the battle of Alesia where Caesar (almost) completed his conquest of Gaul, before becoming chief of the village. In Asterix and the Chieftain's Shield, it was revealed that the shield he is carried on originally belonged to the legendary Gaulish warrior chief Vercingetorix. His father was the village chief before him. He has a brother, Doublehelix, in Lutetia who has a young daughter and a son, Justforkix.

The introduction to each story states that Vitalstatistix has only one fear "that the sky may fall on his head tomorrow"; however, he rarely alludes to this in an actual story, and then only as a rallying cry: "We have nothing to fear but ...".  This characteristic is based on a real historical account where Gallic chieftains were asked by Alexander the Great what they were most afraid of in all the world, and replied that their worst fear was that the sky might fall on their heads.

Although the chief of the village, his role in most plots is usually minor, commonly featuring him granting Asterix and Obelix permission to go on their latest missions, although he has shown a greater involvement in stories such as Asterix and the Big Fight when he had to battle a rival chieftain, Asterix and the Chieftain's Shield when he traveled to a health spa on Getafix's orders to cure a liver complaint and to lose weight, Asterix in Belgium, where he traveled to Belgium to defend his honor when Caesar apparently proclaimed that the Belgians were the bravest of all the Gaulish peoples, or Asterix and Caesar's Gift, where he ran against a new arrival in the village for the position of chief.

 French and Dutch: Abraracourcix ( literally — "with shortened arms" from the French phrase  – "to attack someone with violence") — this is the same in Italian, Portuguese, Spanish (also called Abrazopartidix in some editions) and (original) Dutch (although the "o" is usually dropped).
In English, his name is a pun on Vital statistics — the government birth and death records of a region and also an expression for a person's measurements (a comment on his size). In the American translation, he was Macroeconomix from macroeconomics. NOTE: In the English version of the Asterix the Gaul film, he also appears to have been called Tonabrix, and in the American dub of the Asterix and the Big Fight film he is called Bombastix.
In Catalan, he is Copdegarròtix  ( — "club hit").
In Croatian in 1990s, he is Vrhovnix, from  means "supreme" (vrhovni, najviši) and -ix. Vrhovnik was attempted title for the supreme leader, i.e. state president's role as the constitutional leader of the national army. New translations from 2010s keep the same nationalist pun, calling the chief Samostalix, from "samostalan", which means "independent" (as in "independent and sovereign state"), and actually alludes to first sentence of the constitution.
In German, Greek, Latin and Scandinavian, he is Majestix from "majestic"; similarly in new Dutch translations he is Heroix from "heroic".
 In Esperanto, he is Moŝtiks ( — your highness).
In Hungarian, he is Hasarengazfix, which means "His belly surely shakes".
In Polish, he is Asparanoiks, referring to paranoia, the fear of the sky falling on his head.
In Turkish, Toptoriks, alluding to his roundness (top meaning ball in Turkish).
In Brazilian Portuguese, his name is usually shortened to Abracurcix.
In Hindi translation, his name is mentioned as मुखिया मोटुमालिक्स (Mukhiya Motumallix), which literally means 'The Fat Chief'.
In Bengali, the chief has a name phonetically similar to some extent to his English one: Bishalakritix (বিশালাকৃতিক্স), taken from the root bishalakriti, which aptly means "of huge proportions".
In Hebrew, his name is לוחמאמיקס (lokhem-amix), meaning "brave warrior".
Also in certain translations is known as Тандарабрикс (Tandarabriks)
In Welsh, he is Einharweinix, from ein harweinydd (our leader).
In Greek film variations he was called Χοντρομπαλίξ (Khontrobalix), from χοντρομπαλάς (khontrobalás, dubbing a man "fat ball"), but is currently referred to as Μαζεστίξ (Mazestix, from French : "majestic"). He was also formerly called Μοναρχίξ (Monarchix) from the word μονάρχης (monárchēs: "monarch") but the name changed in the later book translations after 1991.
In Sinhala —  which means big or head/leader.
In some other translations, he is Vserasturix. The name comes from words Vse which means "all" and razturati means having talent for something or "destroying".
In Romanian, he is Brațscurtarix.  meaning "arm" and  meaning "short".
In Russian, he is Жизнестатистикс (Zhiznestatistiks). "Жизнь" means "life", and "Статистика" means "statistics". In the "Asterix: The Mansions of the Gods" the chief is named "Авторитарикс" (Avtoritarix). In the "Asterix & Obelix Take on Caesar" he is named "Абранакортикс" (broken version of the French name).
In Bulgarian, he is Найдобрикс (Naidobrix), derived from "най-добър", simply meaning "the best one".
In Czech, he is Majestatix, derived from word Majestátní meaning majestic.
In Icelandic he is Aðalríkur.

Chief's shield-bearers

From Asterix and Caesar's Gift onwards, Vitalstatistix has had the same (unnamed) shield-bearers carry (and drop) him; prior to that, he had different bearers in each album. In Asterix in Switzerland, he fires both his shield-bearers after he tells them that it is a lovely day, and they look up, tipping the shield back and dropping the chief in the process. He then goes and hires new shield-bearers including Asterix, Geriatrix, Fulliautomatix and Obelix (in these cases the shield is horribly tilted, so he is forced to stand on a slant, and Obelix carried him with one hand like a waiter). The introduction page varies between showing the bearers straining under Vitalstatistix' not inconsiderable bulk as he looks into the distance in some of the books, while in others he looks at them in good humour as they look up to him in respect.

Impedimenta

First appearance: Asterix and the Big Fight (but not named until Asterix and the Chieftain's Shield).
Impedimenta is the matriarchal wife of chief Vitalstatistix, leader of the village wives and the best cook in the village. She is often disappointed with the other villagers (calling them barbarians) and wishes Vitalstatistix was more ambitious. Consequently, she zealously defends and flaunts every privilege due to her as first lady of the village, such as skipping the queue at the fishmongers. She frequently says she wants to go back to Lutetia and live with her successful merchant brother, Homeopathix — the one member of the family her husband openly dislikes.

She nicknamed Vitalstatistix "Piggywiggy" when they were courting, and starts doing this again in Asterix and the Soothsayer as a plan to make Asterix and Obelix erupt in hysterical laughter when she calls him by that name in front of them, thus irritating him and making him punish them by forcing them to stay in the village, away from the soothsayer.

On occasion she has an antagonistic rivalry with Mrs. Geriatrix that has erupted into violence.  One such occasion was in Asterix and the Magic Carpet where the two beat each other with fish from Unhygenix's store over the fakir Watziznehm's carpet.

While usually presented in the books as a nag to her embarrassed husband, she has on occasion fought the Romans side by side with the men, typically using her rolling pin as a weapon.  In emergencies, she's famous for remaining in control, as in Asterix and Son where during a Roman attack she fearlessly led the women and children out of the burning village.

Her name appears to derive either from the Latin military term "impedimenta", meaning "baggage", or from the English word "impediment", meaning obstruction or hindrance.

In French: Bonnemine (meaning "good countenance", derived from the French expression "faire bonne mine" for "putting on a brave face") — also used in Swedish or Esperanto; chief Abraracourcix calls her Mimine.
In Greek: Bonemina — and sometimes "Mimina" 
In English, the name is derived from impediment, an obstacle, but possibly also a reference to the Latin impedimenta, meaning baggage; (in the American translations: Belladonna — a poisonous plant used in cosmetics whose name means beautiful lady).
In Italian, she is Beniamina, more often "Mimina".
In Spanish, she is Karabella  (meaning "beautiful face").
In Portuguese, she is called Bonemine in some stories and Caralinda in others (Portuguese , "beautiful face").
In the Brazilian translation, she is Naftalina.
In Dutch, she is Bellefleur (a name for a type of red apple; "beautiful flower" in French).
In German, she is Gutemine; Danish and Norwegian, Godemine, presumably from the old saying  (or a false-friend translation of Bonnemine with bonne correctly translated as gut, but mine falsely mapped to Miene (German)),  (Danish): "To keep up appearances in the face of bad deeds", literally: "To show a happy face along a bad game"), and mirroring the French .
In Hungarian, she is Hengerlice; which means "tumbler pigeon", a pun on her being a little fat.
In Turkish, she is Dediğimdediks.  refers to someone who insists on getting their way.
In Icelandic, she is Aðalbjörg (an ancient Icelandic name which means "noble female protector").
In Finnish, she is Smirgeline (a pun on the Finnish word  meaning both "emery" and "bench grinder", by way of the Finnish dysphemism for a "shrew" being a grinder)
In Polish, she is Dobromina (most likely a pun on the Polish saying , which has the same meaning as the German/Danish/Norwegian translation above, and the old Polish female given name Dobromira ("the one who values goodness and peace") or Dobromiła ("the one who is good and nice").
In Bengali she is called আপত্তিকা
In Catalan, she is sometimes called Bonemina, but more usually Karabella.
In Hindi, she is referred to as प्यारी सिरदर्दा (Pyari Sirdarda), the beloved, who causes Headache.
In Hebrew, she is called זיופנים (Zivpanim), meaning "bright face".
In Sinhala: 
In Serbian, she is Bombona, literally meaning "candy", but also something lovely and well-arranged.
In Bulgarian, she is Душомоя (Dushomoya). "Душо моя" is a common pet name in Bulgaria used by husbands when addressing their wives (usually with older couples). Literally translates as "my soul".
In Czech, she is Bledulína meaning "pale skinned", or Bonemína as well.
In the new Scots translations, she is Boniquine meaning "beautiful woman".

Cacofonix

Cacofonix is the village bard. He is usually only a supporting character, but has a major part in the plots of some albums (see Asterix and the Normans, Asterix the Gladiator, Asterix and the Magic Carpet, The Mansions of the Gods, and Asterix and the Secret Weapon). He loves singing and playing his lyre, and jumps at every opportunity to do so. He also plays the bagpipes, drum and a Celtic trumpet resembling a boar called a Carnyx. While he can accompany traditional dances, and conducts a village band, his singing is atrocious. In Asterix and the Normans it is so unbearable that it teaches the ferocious Normans the meaning of fear. In later albums his music is so spectacularly horrible that it actually starts thunderstorms (even indoors), because of an old French saying that bad singing causes rain.

For his part, Cacofonix considers himself a genius and a superb singer, and he is angrily offended when people criticize his singing, to the point of dismissing them as barbarians. He is slightly effeminate, often seen smoothing back his hair and holding his head up high.

Some villagers go to extreme lengths to avoid hearing Cacofonix's music. Most notably, Fulliautomatix, the village smith, bangs him on the head at the merest hint of breaking into a song, and has destroyed his lyre on a number of occasions, at one point being called the "ancestor of music critics". As a running gag, Cacofonix is generally tied up and gagged during the banquet at the end of most albums to allow the other villagers to have a good time without having to keep him from singing. He is nonetheless well liked when not singing.

In contrast to the villagers, some of the younger generations whom Cacofonix has met do appreciate his "talent": Justforkix (in Asterix and the Normans) actually encouraged Cacofonix to think seriously about moving to Lutetia where he claimed the bard's way with music would be enjoyed; Pepe (in Asterix in Spain) liked it because it reminded him of home (the goats bleating in his village); and Princess Orinjade (in Asterix and the Magic Carpet) expressed similar enthusiasm, though it was perhaps in gratitude for his music having saved her from being sacrificed. Similarly, the village youths express a liking for his unconventional music in Asterix and the Chieftain's Daughter.

Unlike the other villagers, whose huts are on the ground, Cacofonix's hut is perched up in a tree. Ostensibly this is so that he can act as a lookout to warn the other villagers of imminent invasion, but the real reason is to let him practise his music as far from everyone as possible. It has been felled several times, often by Obelix, but has been replanted, or restored by Getafix's magic acorns (in The Mansions of the Gods).

In the English and American adaptations of the series, he speaks in an effeminate voice.

In the animated Asterix and the Big Fight, Cacofonix is seen playing a rock song trying to restore Getafix's memory, one occasion where Fulliautomatix and Unhygienix are not annoyed or angry with him.

He and Getafix are the village's teachers, as only bards and druids are allowed to teach in school. He is rarely seen fighting the Romans (not even joining fish-fights that often) except when his personal honour is impugned and appear to be more pacifistic than the rest of the villagers. His voice apparently does not mix well with the magic potion, although in Asterix and the Magic Carpet it actually restores him to full voice.  The fact that he is incredibly arrogant may also be partly to blame, as in at least one volume (Asterix and the Roman Agent) he is shown to have not even noticed the other villagers are fighting the Romans and is actually shown asking Getafix what's going on (however, he had been suffering from a lost voice earlier in this volume and may have simply been staying in his hut while waiting to recover). In Asterix and the Missing Scroll it is revealed that he is the second stage of the village's 'emergency measure' if they are attacked while Getafix is absent; the first stage involves a secret supply of potion in the chief's hut, while the second stage involves Cacofonix blowing on a very loud horn to set up a signal to alert Getafix to danger, Vitalstatistix noting that this is the main reason the village still puts up with Cacofonix.

 French and Dutch: Assurancetourix ( meaning "comprehensive insurance") – also in Spanish (Asuranceturix), Catalan (Assegurançatórix), Italian, Portuguese and original Dutch translations.
In English and Romanian Cacofonix is derived from cacophonic (describing "harsh and unpleasant sounds"), from Greek κακός (kakos, meaning "bad") and φωνή (phonē, meaning "voice"). In the American version of the series, he was called Malacoustix, which refers to "bad acoustics". In the English dub of the film Asterix the Gaul he is called Stopthemusix (a pun on the phrase "stop the music") and in the American dub of the Asterix and the Big Fight film he is called Franksinatrix (a pun on Frank Sinatra).
In Greek he is Κακοφωνίξ (Kakofonix) and similarly Kakofonix, Kakofoniks in Polish, Turkish and in new Dutch translations.
In Serbian, his name is Тамбурикс (Tamburiks). The name comes from tambura, a very popular instrument in Serbia. Tamburati ("to play tambura") is Serbian slang meaning "to beat someone up". At the end of many albums, Tamburiks often gets beaten up, gagged and tied to a tree.
In Croatian, his name is Tamburix. The name comes from tambura, a very popular folk instrument in Croatia. In new translations he is Kozoderix; the name means "derati se kao koza", i.e. "to yell like a goat". 
In German and Swedish, he is Troubadix; in Danish, Norwegian and Finnish Trubadurix, and in Czech Trubadix. These are puns on "troubadour", a word for "bard".
In the Brazilian Portuguese translation he is Chatotorix (meaning "annoying" or "the very dull one").
In Hindi, he is गवैयाँ बेसुरीक्स (Gavaiyañ Besurix) meaning "one who sings out of tune".
In Bengali, this bard is known as Kawlorobix (কলরবিক্স) – the root being  – meaning "making a lot of noise for no purpose"
In Hungarian translation he is Hangjanix, which means "He absolutely has no voice".
Similarly, the Esperanto name Malmuziks means "the contrary of music".
In Hebrew, חמשיריקס (Khamshirix) which can be literally translated back as Limerix (from "limerick").
In Icelandic he is Óðríkur, originally meaning "rich in odes" but can also be interpreted as "rich in madness". A music-making competition in one of Iceland's most prestigious pre-colleges is named in his honour.
In Latin, he is Cantorix, from  "singer".
In Bulgarian, he is Всебезрикс (Vsebezrix). Most likely derived from "все без риск", meaning "always without risk", which is somewhat close to his original French name, but it can also be interpreted as "в себе си се взира", meaning "looks into himself", which might be a reference to him being an artist.
In Irish, his name is Dándírix – Dán Díreach is a style of Irish poetry designed to be accompanied by a harp.
In Scots, he is Magonaglix – after the notoriously incompetent Scottish poet William McGonagall.

Geriatrix
First Appearance: Asterix the Gladiator but first named in Asterix at the Olympic Games
Geriatrix is the oldest inhabitant of Asterix's village: he is mentioned as 93 years old in  Asterix at the Olympic Games (while drunk, he says he feels ten years younger, to which Asterix replies, "Well, that makes you 83, and it's time you were in bed"). Some translations make him no more than 80.

As an elder, Geriatrix demands respect (generally more than he is given). Nonetheless he dislikes being treated as old and will attack anyone who comments to that effect. In particular he often beats up the village blacksmith Fulliautomatix for refusing to fight back due to his age, and actually cries out to be attacked (in Asterix and the Roman Agent). Geriatrix is seen to sit on the village council at times, on the face of it an entitlement deriving from being the oldest in the community. An example is on p. 11 of Asterix and the Cauldron where he sits with Vitalstatistix, Cacofonix and Getafix, in deciding on Asterix's punishment for having violated their honor code. In Asterix and the Roman Agent he acquires a club which he later uses to knock down The Mansions of the Gods.

Geriatrix is against foreigners who are not from his village. He is a veteran of the Battle of Gergovia and the Battle of Alesia, and refers to them when excited ("It'll be just like Gergovia all over!") or distraught ("It's just like Alesia all over again!").
He has an eye for the young ladies and has a very young and beautiful wife (who appears to be in her twenties) of whom he is very possessive — particularly when Obelix is around.

In prequels such as How Obelix Fell into the Magic Potion When he was a Little Boy, in which most of the characters are children and Vitalstatistix is a slim young man, Geriatrix, along with Getafix, is unchanged.
In Bengali he is known as অস্থিক্স
In English, the name comes from Geriatrics, the branch of medicine dealing with old age. He is also known as Arthritix in the American translations.
In Greek, he is Μαθουσαλίξ (Mathousalix), from Μαθουσάλα (Methuselah).
In Spanish, he is Edadepiedrix and Edatdepèdrix in Catalan (meaning "Stone Age").
In Finnish and  the Scandinavian languages, he is Senilix (from senile).
In Italian, he is Matusalemix, from Matusalem (Methuselah), the biblical "old man", similarly in German, Methusalix and in Greek he is Μαθουσαλίξ (Mathousalix), formerly Παλαιοντολογίξ (Palaiontologix).
 In Serbian, he is Дедовикс (Dedoviks), from Serbian  ("grandfather").
In Hebrew, מתושלחיקס, אשמאיקס, קשישניקס (Methushelakhix, Ashmaix (Asterix at the Olympic Games), Kashishnix (Animated films)).
In Dutch, he is Nestorix (after Nestor).
In Croatian, he is Metuzalemix, from Methuselah and -ix.
In Esperanto, he is Dojeniks (from  — doyen, wise old man)
In Polish, he is Ramoliks ("grumpy old man") or Długowieczniks ("long living").
In the Brazilian Portuguese translation he is Veteranix or Matusalix (based on Matusalém, the portuguese version of the name Methuselah).
In the Hindi translation he is बुड्ढिक्स (Buddhix), which means "the old man".
In Turkish he is Eskitopraks meaning "old timer".
In Indonesian he is Capeloyonix which loosely translates to "old hunched man who is easily tired". (Cape – pronounced as Chapeh: meaning tired; Loyo; meaning weak)
In Bulgarian, he is Старикс (Starix), from the word "старик", meaning "old timer" or "old geezer".
In Czech, he is Archaix based on word "archaic". In some cases he is called Kmetix based on word "kmeť" meaning very old man.
In Slovene, he is Pradedix which comes from the word "praded", meaning "Great-grandfather". In some newer translations, he is Metuzalemček from Methuselah. The newer name doesn't quite fit in with the others as it isn't ending with -ix.

Mrs. Geriatrix
First Appearance: Asterix and the Roman Agent
Mrs. Geriatrix enjoys her husband's devotion and also her status as wife of the village's most senior inhabitant, which makes her one of the inner circle of village wives. Her youthful appearance suggests that she is less than half her husband's age; she is also a lot taller. Although as ambitious and gossip-prone as the other wives, she has also shown herself to be very quick-witted. She is an excellent seamstress but has Geriatrix do most of the housework. She rules her home and marriage, and regularly tells her husband what to do even in direct contradiction of his own stated opinions. She does seem to be happily married, however, and the only serious conflict in her marriage is her occasional apparent interest in Obelix which makes her husband insanely jealous. On one occasion, she is offered the magic potion. She does not appear to be interested and says that it's very fattening, while staring at Obelix. She appears to be in favour of women's rights, as shown in Asterix and the Secret Weapon. She eagerly accepted the radical changes in the village that occurred in this story. She and Impedimenta cause a gigantic fight in "Mini Midi Maxi".

 She has never been officially named and is always referred to by the local title for wife and the translation of her husband's name (Uderzo has stated she is partially based on his own wife and he wishes to retain an air of mystery). In Asterix and the Soothsayer, Impedimenta appears to address her as Myopia (which, given her choice of spouse would be extremely appropriate), but, as explained in this page’s note, this is an invocation to a Gaulish Goddess (of short-sightedness) thus a double entendre.

Unhygienix

First appearance: Asterix in Spain
Unhygienix is the village fishmonger, as was his father Unhealthix before him (as seen in Asterix and the Class Act). His fish do not come from the sea near the village even though he has a fishing boat; instead they are transported all the way from Lutetia (and from Massilia in the German translations) as he believes they are of finer quality. He does not notice their smell, but most of the other villagers do and a lot of fights are caused by his stale fish, as when the blacksmith Fulliautomatix says: "Anyway, it [the fight] wouldn't have happened if they [the fish] were fresh!" and then Unhygenix slaps him with his fish.
He regularly has fights about his fish with his friend Fulliautomatix, the village blacksmith, which often escalate to involve most of the village. Fulliautomatix says the fish are stale, Unhygienix throws a fish at him, he throws it back, it hits someone else, etc., and the whole village gets into a fight. This rivalry is a family tradition — their fathers also fought, and their children are continuing it. Despite this, his catch phrase is a scream to his wife, "Bacteria! Get the fish inside!" or "Save the sales!", in fights on the village he doesn't want to enter (i.e. fights that are not about his fish), when villagers buy or steal his fish to fight with. 
 French: Ordralfabétix (meaning "alphabetical order") — this is essentially the same in Spanish (Ordenalfabétix), Portuguese, Catalan and Italian (Ordinalfabetix), as well as Hebrew (לפיסדראלפאבטיקס, Lefisederalphabetix)
In English, he is Unhygienix ("unclean" from "unhygienic"), and in the American dub of Asterix and the Big Fight, he is called Fishstix (from fish sticks).
In Croatian, he is Abecedix from alphabet and -ix.
In Dutch, he is Kostunrix ("costs a riks",  being short for rijksdaalder, 2½ guilders)
In German, he is Verleihnix  ( — "(I) do not lend anything", especially not fish because, as Bacteria puts it, people are so careless and return the fish in poor condition).
In Swedish, he is Crabbofix (close to "crab and fish")
In Danish, he is Hørmetix ( means "to stink")
In Norwegian, he is Hermetix ( refers to the food contained in hermetic tin cans)
In Polish, he is Szykalfabetiks ("alphabetical order") or Ahigieniks ("unhygienic")
In Hungarian, he is Messesaglix ("stinks far")
In Serbian, he is Аеробикс (Aerobiks) — a pun on the word "aerobics"
In Portuguese, he is "Ordenalfabetix" ("alphabetic order")
In Esperanto, his name is Fiŝaĉiks ["fishachix"] ( — rotten fish)
In Hebrew, his name is בסדראלפבתיקס ["beseder-alephbetix"] meaning in lexicographical order.
In Finnish, he is Amaryllix, from "Amaryllis", an amphipod, albeit in Finnish being the word better known as the flower Amaryllis belladonna.
In Greek, he is Αλφαβητίξ (Alfavētix) meaning "alphabet" — formerly Καταλφαβητίξ (Katalfavētix) meaning "in alphabetical order".
In Turkish, he is Palamutiks.  is Turkish for Bonito.
In Sinhala, he is  meaning "The man with the rotten fish".
In English newspaper editions in Malaysia, he is "Fishmix".
In Bulgarian, he is Азбучникс (Azbuchnix), derived from "азбука", meaning "alphabet". In addition to being a direct translation of the original French name, this could also be a reference to the first published Bulgarian schoolbook, which taught children the alphabet and featured a picture of a whale at the end of it, giving it the nickname "The Fish Schoolbook" (despite whales being mammals, not fish).
In Czech, he is Alfabetix based on English word "alphabet".
in Scots, he is Minginhaddix, the play being mingin' haddocks. Minging is a colloquialism used in various regions of the United Kingdom including Scotland, meaning disgusting. 
In Russian, he is Антисанитарикс based on "Anti sanitation".

Bacteria

First appearance: Asterix in Spain
Bacteria is the wife of Unhygienix. She is one of the inner circle of village wives. She is quiet and easy-going, but doesn't hesitate to say exactly what she thinks. She helps her husband run his shop, selling fish of dubious quality, and is unperturbed by the bizarre uses to which they are sometimes put. They have two sons (one of whose names have not been mentioned) — Blinix in Asterix in Corsica, and the other with red hair in Asterix and the Secret Weapon.
In Asterix and Obelix's Birthday: The Golden Book Blinix is seen having taken over the shop but rather than to import the fish from Lutetia, he gets the fish he sells from the nearby sea. This displeases his father who fears that the "good name of the shop will go to waste" that way.

 French: Iélosubmarine (a pun on "Yellow Submarine") — a variant of this is used in most translations, e.g. Jellosubmarine in German.
In English, bacteria is the name for a kingdom of microorganisms, some of which are responsible for various diseases, keeping the same unsanitary character as her husband's name.
In Dutch, she is Forentientje ("for a tenner", matching the monetary theme of her husband's name).
In Scandinavian, she is Remouladine. (After the dressing, remoulade, popular in Scandinavia and often eaten along with fish.)
 In Polish and Czech as well, she is Jelousubmarina, which is "yellow submarine" written according to Polish pronunciation and with a female ending. Similar in German: Jellosubmarine and in Finnish: Jelousubmarine.

Blinix 
First appearance: Asterix in Corsica

Blinix is Bacteria's and Unhygienix's son. In Asterix and the Chieftain's Daughter, he helps Adrenaline run away.

Fulliautomatix
Fulliautomatix is the village smith. His father, Semiautomatix, was the village smith before him. He is tall and robust, and very strong — he is one of the strongest characters, perhaps second only to Obelix, and a bit of a ruffian, especially to Cacofonix. Fulliautomatix's first appearance was in the first volume, Asterix the Gaul, where the Roman spy was amazed that he used his fists to forge iron. However, he is subsequently shown using a normal hammer and is now rarely seen without one.
A very different looking Fulliautomatix appeared in Asterix and the Banquet in which he and Obelix argue as to who should be entitled to punch the Roman that they are both engaged in hitting anyway.

Fulliautomatix often interacts with Unhygienix, the fishmonger, with whom he has a friendly rivalry. Fulliautomatix claims the fish he sells are stale, and this often results in Unhygienix throwing a fish at his face, causing a fight (sometimes the other villagers join in just for fun).
Fulliautomatix also takes great pleasure in abusing, breaking the lyre of Cacofonix the bard, threatening him and hitting him on the head at the merest hint of breaking into a song (the songs are so bad that the other villagers do not object) — this happens so frequently that Cacofonix only protests about it if he hadn't intended to sing in the first place (such as in Asterix and Cleopatra, where it turned out Cacofonix just wanted to tell Fulliautomatix that he was standing on Cacofonix's toes, which Fulliautomatix was unaware of due to the current snow covering their feet). It has been stated that he is perhaps the ancestor of all music critics. On the other hand, he is occasionally beaten up with a cane by Geriatrix when he is provoked by some comment the smith makes. When this happens he will often take out his frustration on the nearest convenient bystander (Cacofonix for preference) on the grounds that he does not feel he can fight back against someone so old, which only helps to further incense the old man.

Fulliautomatix also has two unnamed children who have appeared in separate comics — a son with blond hair in Asterix in Corsica, and a daughter with blonde hair in Asterix and the Secret Weapon. In Asterix and the Great Divide he is shown as having an apprentice, though it is not specified if he's a relative; some speculate that he is the young son grown to teenage years, while in Asterix and the Chieftain's Daughter a young man resembling him is introduced as his eldest son, Selfipix. In Asterix and Obelix's Birthday: The Golden Book Fulliautomatix is seen as an elderly man with his now adult son having taken over business; the scene begins with his son making steel dentures for Fulliautomatix, who has gone toothless over the years.

 French: Cétautomatix (meaning "it is automatic") — the languages of Iberia follow fairly literally: Esautomátix in Spanish, Esautomàtix in Catalan and Zetautomatix in Basque; in Portuguese Ceutautomatix or Éautomatix.
In English, the name is a pun on "fully automatic"
In Croatian, he is Poluautomatix means "Semiautomatix".
In German and Italian he is simply Automatix.
In Greek he is Αυτοματίξ (Automatix).
In Polish, he is Automatiks, or Tenautomatiks.
In Czech, he is Automatix, or Kovomatix where "kovo" means metallic.
In Esperanto, his name is Tutaŭtomatiks.
In Dutch, he is Hoefnix — a double pun:  means "hoof" and the phrase  means "I don't need/want anything" referring to Unhygienix's fish.
In Brazilian Portuguese, he is just Automatix.
In Danish, Norwegian and Latin, he is Armamix — in Latin,  means to provide arms, to equip with weapons.
In Icelandic versions, he is Ryðríkur. Ironically,  means "rust" in Icelandic.
In Swedish versions, Smidefix (as a pun on the words "smith" and "fix")
In Turkish, he is Tamotomatiks, meaning "fully automatic".
In Finnish, he is Caravellix, possibly as a pun on the boat model Karaveli, meaning Caravel.
In Serbian, he is Металопластикс (Metaloplastiks), as a pun on the words "metal" and "plastics", but also on the name of the famous handball team Metaloplastika from Šabac
In Hindi translation, he is बदबोलिक्स लोहातोडिक्स (Badbolix Lohatodix), which means "ill-spoken iron-breaker"
In Hebrew, נשקאוטומאטיקס (Neshek-Otomatix) means "automatic weapon".
In Bulgarian, he is Ударникс (Udarnix), derived from "ударник", which could translate as either "hammer" or "striker". "Удар" by itself also means "to hit".

Mrs. Fulliautomatix
First appearance: Asterix and the Roman Agent
Mrs. Fulliautomatix is one of the inner circle of village wives. One of the shortest women in the village, and possessing of a steep and pointy nose, she takes no nonsense and dominates her much larger husband as well as getting into a brawl with the wife of Chief Vitalstatistix in Asterix and the Class Act. Although she appears often, she has never been named in the stories. She has been known to beat up Cacofonix on occasion as well, in Asterix and the Secret Weapon. She has a brother, as mentioned by her husband in Asterix and the Black Gold.

Julius Caesar

Julius Caesar (Jules César) is the Roman dictator and conqueror of Gaul. Many of the stories involve his schemes to finally conquer this last Gaulish village holding out against his legions. At other times, the village has (indirectly) come to his aid, but more often it is a major embarrassment to him in the Roman senate — in at least one book, the entire senate is laughing at him after a failed plan. Despite this, Caesar is also shown to be a man of honour, since whenever Asterix and Obelix somehow end up helping Caesar, Caesar always grants them any favour they ask. He goes so far as to rebuild the entire Gaulish village when it was destroyed by Brutus who was trying to kidnap Caesar's son, whom Asterix returned safely to his family (Asterix and Son). The appearance of Caesar is based on portraits found on ancient Roman coins.

The Pirates

In the course of their travels, Asterix and Obelix regularly cross paths with — and beat up — a group of pirates. The Gauls then proceed to sink their ship, causing the pirates severe financial difficulties. The pirates make their first appearance in the fourth album (Asterix the Gladiator), and feature in almost every subsequent album.

The main pirates are based on the Belgian comic series Barbe Rouge (1959 and continuing). The adventures of Barbe Rouge (Redbeard) and his son Eric were published in Pilote magazine, where Asterix's adventures were also published prior to appearing in book form.

Although Barbe Rouge is a popular character in his own right in continental Europe, the popularity of Asterix's pirates is one of the few occasions when parody figures have overshadowed their originals.

On one occasion (in Asterix the Legionary) after the wreck the pirates were depicted in a scene similar to Théodore Géricault's Raft of the Medusa. In the English version of this scene, the captain also refers to an ancient Gaulish artist called "Jericho", an alternative spelling of the name Géricault.

Such is the fear that the pirates have for the Gauls that, having unknowingly taken them aboard—Asterix and his companions boarded the ship in the night when it was too dark for either side to see the other properly, with the pirates only learning the truth when they sneaked into their guests' cabin to rob them—they fled their own ship in the middle of the night while the subjects of their fear were sound asleep (Asterix in Corsica). At other times, it is Asterix and Obelix who have boarded the pirates' vessel and captured booty, thus reversing their roles of hunter and prey. This has happened mainly in the quest for food in an empty ocean (Asterix in Spain). On another occasion, Asterix and Obelix take all the food on the ship, leaving the pirates with a single sausage for the Captain's birthday; the pirates decide to look on the bright side and note that their ship didn't sink (Asterix and the Great Crossing). It happened again (in Asterix and the Magic Carpet) with Asterix leaving a single coin for payment after Obelix threw all of their recently recovered treasure overboard while searching for food; the Captain told his depressed crew that it was better than nothing and that at least they still had the ship, but then their lookout proudly announced that he had upheld their honour and scuttled the ship himself. The other pirates were not impressed.

This "honorable suicide-sinking" has actually happened in earlier Asterix adventures, such as in Asterix and Cleopatra when the captain himself sank the ship after learning that the Gauls were on a nearby Egyptian vessel, reasoning that that would be the eventual outcome and doing it themselves would spare them a punch-up. Curiously enough, at the end of the same adventure, he and his crew were having to work as rowers aboard the very galley taking the Gauls back home and he announced with unusual determination that he will hunt them down and get his revenge. On another occasion, the pirates destroyed their ship simply at the sight of Asterix and all his fellow villagers in another vessel taking them to the Olympic Games. In this event, though, the villagers did not attack since the captain of their ship announced that attacking the pirates would cost them extra. At the end of Asterix in Britain, the captain, in a panic, orders his men to row as fast as they can in order to get away from Asterix and Obelix, only for them to run aground on a beach. But the captain states that this is better than being sunk again.

On two occasions, Asterix also forced the Captain to spend all his hard-won loot on the merchandise of Ekonomikrisis the Phoenician merchant (Asterix and the Black Gold). On one occasion (The Mansions of the Gods) the Pirates appear on land, as part of the group of slaves (later freed) in the story. However, in one story so far—Asterix and the Cauldron—they end up happy for a change when a cauldron full of money that Asterix has been chasing throughout the story is tipped over a cliff and lands in their laps.

The main pirates are:
 Redbeard (Barbe Rouge) — captain of the pirates.
 Pegleg (Triple Patte) — an old pirate with a wooden leg who makes classical quotations in Latin.
 Pirate Lookout (Baba) — the African pirate in the crow's nest. He also has a cousin who is a gladiator (see Asterix and the Cauldron). In the original French and some other language versions he fails to pronounce the letters 'R' and 'L', leaving blanks in his speech. Early English translations also had him speaking something that resembled Jamaican Patois but this has been replaced by standard British English in re-editions, his manner of speaking no longer being a source of humour. He is sometimes confused with Flaturtha the Numidian, leader of the slaves in The Mansions of the Gods. However, these are actually two separate characters;  Flaturtha has a different hairstyle, face shape, and physique.
 Erix — the captain's son. Seen in Asterix and the Banquet, he is mentioned in Asterix and Cleopatra as being left as a deposit on a new ship.

In addition a number of members of the pirate crew are sight gags, some of whom have appeared on more than one occasion such as Frankenstein's monster and a Mongol warrior.

It should also be noted that in the films where the pirates are seen, Erix replaces Pegleg on the jetsam with Redbeard.

Minor recurring characters
Original (French) name is given in parentheses when different.

Historical figures

 Queen Cleopatra (Cléopâtre) — Queen of Egypt. Other characters often make remarks about her beautiful nose. She appears on the cover of Asterix and Cleopatra, where Asterix, Obelix and Getafix are asked for aid from an Egyptian architect to build a palace in three months, as Cleopatra has a bet with Caesar to show the greatness of the Egyptians and has threatened to feed the architect to the crocodiles if he fails. She is also in Asterix and Son—where she sends her son by Caesar to Asterix for safekeeping as Brutus has tried to kill him—and Asterix and Obelix All at Sea, where she is in Rome with Caesar. In Asterix and Son, she has fairer skin and a shorter, differently shaped nose, while in All At Sea she has darker skin than her first appearance and the smaller nose of her second appearance. Her appearance in the comic is seemingly based on Elizabeth Taylor's screen depiction of the historical figure.

 Brutus — Marcus Junius Brutus, (unhistorically) depicted as Caesar's adopted son. Constantly plays with a knife, a reference to him being one of Caesar's assassins in real life. This is alluded to in Asterix and the Soothsayer, where a soothsayer tells Caesar that if he keeps Brutus near he will come to no harm. The series includes numerous other references to the future assassination, such as Brutus muttering resentfully to himself, after being slighted by Caesar, "one of these days I'll....." (Asterix and the Roman Agent), or, Caesar thinking to himself "That Brutus... I can see I'm going to have trouble with him." (Asterix the Gladiator). Caesar often uses the Shakespearean quote: "" to him for various purposes. Brutus appears in minor roles in various books, and has a major role in Asterix and Son, where his plot to kill Caesar and Cleopatra's infant son to secure his place as Caesar's heir prompts him to attack the village when Cleopatra sends her son there for safety, causing Caesar to send him to Upper Germania. Brutus's physical appearance is arguably different in each of his appearances. He also appears in the animated film The Twelve Tasks of Asterix where Julius Caesar says to him "Brutus, stop playing about with that knife you'll end up hurting somebody". While Brutus is off screen you hear an "ouch" in the background, and the next shot of Brutus he has a bandage around his finger.
 Pompey (Pompée) — Caesar's greatest enemy and a former consul of Rome. He is mentioned in Asterix the Gladiator, Asterix the Legionary and Asterix and the Roman Agent and appears in person in Asterix and the Actress, where he is the book's antagonist, seeking valuable pieces of armour that have been given to Asterix and Obelix as birthday presents. In Asterix and the Roman Agent his name was invoked in the Roman quarrels, accusing one another for being under Pompey's pay, meaning they are allied with Pompey at all.
 Metellus Scipio (Scipion) — Another of Caesar's enemies, allied to Pompey. Caesar defeated him in the Battle of Thapsus, as depicted in Asterix the Legionary. Note that Pompey doesn't make an appearance there, as he was assassinated before these events took place (though he anachronistically surfaces in Asterix and the Actress later).
 Caesarion — Caesar and Cleopatra's baby boy. Appears in Asterix and Son where he is sent to the village for safety. He drinks the magic potion twice, causing trouble for the villagers and the Romans sent to capture him, but it has worn off by the end and he is reunited with his family. He shows a liking for sleeping under trees.
 Vercingetorix — Arvernian chieftain, who is shown as a historical figure surrendering Gaul in various books by throwing his arms on the feet of Caesar, which comically hurt Caesar's feet. His shield is at the centre of Asterix and the Chieftain's Shield, and his fictional daughter Adrenalin in Asterix and the Chieftain's Daughter.
 Cassivellaunus — British chieftain who resists the Roman invasion. Appears in Asterix in Britain.

Villagers
 Monosyllabix and Polysyllabix (Petitélégrafix) — Villagers that appear together, first in Obelix and Co., where they appear on the cover. They also appear in Asterix in Belgium and Asterix and the Secret Weapon.
 Obese lady — another of Impedimenta's inner circle of village wives, however unlike the others, her husband and name are unknown.
 Soporifix (Plantaquatix) — father of Panacea who is mentioned in Asterix the Legionary, but not seen until Asterix and the Actress.
Other villagers mentioned by name (and presumed to be recurring part of crowd scenes):
Operatix (Boulimix), Acoustix (Aventurépix), Harmonix (Allegorix), Polyfonix (Porquepix) and Polytechnix (Elèvedelix) in Asterix and the Normans
Pacifix (Linguistix), Atlantix (Arrierboutix), Baltix (Harenbaltix), Adriatix (Choucroutgarnix) and Analgesix (Analgésix) in Obelix and Co.
Bucolix (Déboîtemendumenix) and Photogenix (Bellodalix) in Asterix and Son, and briefly in Obelix and Co.
Tenansix (Cétyounix) in Asterix the Gaul – named for the old pre-1970s British monetary amount of 10½ shillings (written as 10s6d or 10/6, spoken as 'Ten and Six'). Decimalisation of UK currency didn't happen until early 1971, well after the first Asterix story was published.
Picanmix (Keskonrix), a youngster in Asterix the Gladiator. Named for the method of buying confectionery from sweet shops in Britain. Also appears in Asterix and Cleopatra
Pectine, a young girl, seen only in Asterix: The Secret of the Magic Potion.  
Scarlatina (Galantine) in "For Gaul Lang Syne"
Chanticleerix (Chanteclairix) — the village's rooster. Has a crush on Vitalstatistix's helmet. Named after the rooster in Geoffrey Chaucer's The Canterbury Tales (specifically The Nun's Priest's Tale).

Gauls
 Postaldistrix (Pneumatix) — Postman. First appears in Asterix and the Normans, when he delivers a letter to Vitalstatistix, also in Asterix the Legionary when he brings Tragicomix's letter to Panacea (see below). Also appears in the "Obelix: As Simple as ABC" short story, later included in Asterix and Obelix's Birthday: The Golden Book. Most recent appearance in Asterix and the Missing Scroll.
 Panacea (Falbala) — A beautiful young lady who is the daughter of Soporifix. She went to school and now lives in Condatum. Obelix has a crush on her. First appears in Asterix the Legionary; also "For Gaul Lang Syne", Asterix and Obelix All at Sea — although this is only a brief appearance — Asterix and the Actress (although the majority of her appearances are that of an impersonator). She sends Obelix a letter and appears in Asterix and Obelix's Birthday: The Golden Book. Along with Tragicomix, she appears in the animated film Asterix Versus Caesar. The same couple appear on the live-action film Asterix and Obelix vs Caesar, played by Laetitia Casta and Hardy Krüger Jr. Belgian singer Angèle will portray Panacea  in the upcoming movie Asterix & Obelix: The Middle Kingdom.
 Tragicomix — Tall, handsome and muscular boyfriend — later husband — of Panacea. He runs a livery stable in Condatum. Appears in Asterix the Legionary and Asterix and the Actress. He has a golden-white body and blonde hair (but with no moustache, unlike almost all Gauls) and often appears bare-chested.
 Justforkix (Goudurix) — Nephew of Vitalstatistix and a city boy from Lutetia. He is a major character in Asterix and the Normans in which he is sent to Vitalstatix's village by his father in order to get "toughened up", winds up being kidnapped by the Normans, and actually overcoming his fears. He also appears in the movie adaptation Asterix and the Vikings as well as several Asterix game books and video games.
 Orthopaedix — An innkeeper from Arausio who appears in Asterix and Caesar's Gift. He and his family move to the village after buying the deeds from Tremensdelirius (who had only been given the deeds by Caesar as a punishment). His wife Angina, after a major altercation with Impedimenta, pressures him into challenging Vitalstatistix for leadership. In the film Asterix and the Vikings his daughter Influenza (Zaza for short) can be seen when the villagers dance.
 Instantmix — Gaulish restaurant owner who helps Asterix and Obelix in Asterix the Gladiator. He later appears in Asterix in Corsica.
 Seniorservix — Sea captain from Gesoriacum who appears in Asterix and the Banquet and Asterix in Corsica. Seniorservix's name is a pun both on his age, and on the Senior Service tobacco traditionally popular among Royal Navy sailors.
 Homeopathix (Homéopatix) — Brother of Impedimenta and a successful merchant in Lutetia. He first appears in Asterix and the Laurel Wreath and is often mentioned in later albums as a figure she would like her husband to emulate (much to his disgust). He has a wife named Tapioca (Galantine).
 Prolix — A traveling soothsayer, he deceives most of the villagers except Asterix, and is proved a fraud by Getafix; appears in Asterix and the Soothsayer, the cartoon Operation Getafix and the live action film Asterix and Obelix vs Caesar.
 Asterix & Obelix's parents — They appear in Asterix and the Actress and short stories "Birth of Asterix" and "How Obelix Fell into the Magic Potion When he was a Little Boy". They are former villagers who now live in Condatum and run a "modernities" shop together.
 Astronomix — Asterix's father
 Sarsaparilla (Praline) — Asterix's mother
 Obeliscoidix (Obélodalix) — Obelix's father
 Vanilla (Gelatine) — Obelix's mother
 Whosmoralsarelastix — The chief of a neighbouring Gaulish village. He is a mean and greedy man who often does business with the Romans. Appears in Asterix and the Cauldron when he tries to trick the Gauls into paying his taxes for him, though by the end he has lost the money he regained.
 Adrenaline — Vercingetorix's teenage daughter, featured in Asterix and the Chieftain's Daughter, brought to the Gaulish village to hide her from the Romans who want to re-educate her as a Roman. Shrewd and rebellious, she is weary of her status as a symbol of rebellion.

Romans
Gracchus Armisurplus (Gracchus Nenjetepus) — Centurion of Compendium (Petibonum) for Asterix the Gladiator and Asterix and the Banquet; however his name is translated differently in each album (in Asterix and the Banquet he appears as Centurion Lotuseatus).
Surplus Dairiprodus – The gluttonous prefect of Lutetia in Asterix and the Golden Sickle.  He spends most of the time eating, and takes practically no interest in serious matters, even those that disturb order (such as Asterix and Obelix causing a fight).
Gluteus Maximus – A Roman legionary chosen to represent Rome at the Olympics in Asterix at the Olympic Games.
Tremensdelirius (Roméomontaigus) — An old, drunken Roman legionary veteran; he causes trouble in Asterix and Caesar's Gift and in Asterix and the Actress. He is the first "one-shot" background character to reappear in the series after a decade-long absence.
Caius Fatuus — A gladiator trainer who is a major character in Asterix the Gladiator and is mentioned in Asterix and the Banquet
Giveusabonus — A fat bald man with a big nose and whip who wears a leather kilt and fetish-style cross straps. He appears in Asterix and the Laurel Wreath, The Mansions of the Gods (as a slave driver) and in the movie The 12 Tasks of Asterix.
Ignoramus — Centurion sent to relieve Scrofulus' garrison in Obelix and Co. He also appears in Asterix in Corsica but looks slightly different.
Crismus Bonus — A centurion who appears in Asterix the Gaul and Asterix and Obelix vs Caesar.  In the animated version of Asterix the Gaul, he is named Phonus Balonus.
Magnumopus — Appeared in Asterix and the Roman Agent as a Roman legionary. He is very big and strong and misunderstands the meaning of psychological warfare; he does not use a pilum or a sword, but a club instead. His small head and helmet make the villagers think a small Roman attacked a villager.
Infirmofpurpus — Appeared in Asterix and the Big Fight and the film Operation Getafix as a Roman legionary. He is leading a Roman patrol when he is hit by a flying cauldron.
Obsequius — Appears in Asterix in Spain, and speaks with a lisp after being punched by the commander-in-chief who has stolen magic potion from Asterix.
Tortuous Convolvulus (Lucius Détritus) — Roman agent sent to stir up dissensions among the Gauls, and succeeds in making the Gauls (and accidentally some of the Romans) think the Romans have the magic potion. Appears in Asterix and the Roman Agent and the live action film Asterix and Obelix vs Caesar.
Centurions Dubius Status and Nefarious Purpus command the unit of Roman infantry which Asterix and Obelix join in Asterix the Legionary.
Vexatius Sinusitus is a corruption-fighting Roman Quaestor, whom Getafix cures of poisoning and who partakes in the Gaulish banquet, in Asterix in Switzerland.
Vitriolix is Caesar's spy in Asterix the Legionary.
Squareonthehypotenus appears in The Mansions of the Gods.  He tries to make a natural park to help Caesar crush the indomitable Gauls. Yet he reappears in Asterix and Obelix's Birthday: the Golden Book however, only to celebrate the party.
Admiral Crustacius appears in Asterix and Obelix All at Sea. He attempts to use the magic potion to overthrow Caesar, but is turned to stone. 
Vice Admiral Nautilus appears in Asterix and Obelix All at Sea. Although he is an antagonist, it is hinted he doesn't have evil intentions.
Caligula Minus appears in Asterix the Gaul. He is appointed by Crismus Bonus to spy on the Gauls to figure out their secret. He finds out about the potion, and tells Crismus Bonus when the Gauls find out that he is a Roman spy.
Voluptuous Arteriosclerosus — Appears in Asterix and the Soothsayer. He is the centurion of the fortified Roman camp of Compendium. At the end of Asterix and the Soothsayer, he gets demoted from centurion to legionary, and his Optio, who he used to be in charge of, instructs him to sweep the camp. He also appears on the final 2-page spread of Asterix and Obelix's Birthday: The Golden Book.

Others
 Anticlimax (Jolitorax) — Asterix's first cousin, once removed. He lives in a British village holding out against the Romans in Asterix in Britain (he appears on the cover). He also appears in Asterix in Corsica and has a nephew who is an escaped galley slave in Asterix and Obelix All at Sea.
 Macaroon – Tattooed Pictish warrior found on the beach frozen in a block of ice. His first name is Crk, because this is the sound his fist makes when punching someone. Asterix and Obelix escort him home in Asterix and the Picts. He has a problem with speaking originally which is what Getafix calls a 'Tummy Rumble'.
Camomilla – Daughter of the Pictish chief and fiancée of Macaroon.
McVicar – Chief of a rival Pictish tribe and ally of the Romans. His clan can be distinguished from Macaroon's, because they wear red and black rather than yellow and green kilts.
 Mykingdomforanos, McAnix and O'veroptimistix — British chieftains representing England, Scotland and Ireland respectively who appear in Asterix in Britain and Asterix in Corsica.
Petitsuix — Swiss innkeeper who appears in Asterix in Switzerland and Asterix in Corsica. His name is a pun on petit suisse, a French cheese.
 Pepe (Pépé) — Young spoiled son of the chief of an Iberian village holding out against the Romans; he appears on the cover of Asterix in Spain in which he is taken hostage by Caesar, but rescued and returned by Asterix and Obelix. He makes life difficult for the Gauls as well as for the Romans, though even Obelix is upset when they finally part. He is one of the few people who like Cacofonix's music, and also has a soft spot for Dogmatix. He visits the village again in Asterix in Corsica.
 Ekonomikrisis (Epidemaïs) — a Phoenician merchant who appears in Asterix the Gladiator and also Asterix and the Black Gold (helping Asterix and Obelix travel to and from Rome and Tyre respectively), and in Asterix and the Chieftain's Daughter. He also appeared in the animated adaptation of Asterix In Britain, but not by name.
 Edifis (Numérobis) — an Egyptian architect and old friend of Getafix. His personality is extended in the movie Asterix & Obelix: Mission Cleopatra by making him not only younger but much more eccentric. This version appears with a small role in the movie Asterix at the Olympic Games.
Olaf Timandahaf (Olaf Grossebaf) — Viking chieftain who kidnaps Justforkix in Asterix and the Normans. In the film adaption, he has a wife named Ikea and a daughter named Abba who ends up as Justforkix's wife.

Caricatures
Alain Prost — Appears as Coronavirus, the Roman champion chariot driver in Asterix and the Chariot Race.
Annie Cordy — Belgian actress who is caricatured as chief Beefix's wife Bonanza in Asterix in Belgium.
Arnold Schwarzenegger — was the inspiration for the super-clones in Asterix and the Falling Sky.
Benito Mussolini — As the centurion Nebulus Nimbus in Asterix and the Big Fight. Like the real Mussolini he's bald, fat and shouts all the time.
Boadicea — Appears in Asterix in Britain as a housewife. She confronts Asterix, Obelix and Anticlimax after they mistakenly break down her door.
Cassius Ceramix (Aplusbegalix) — Gaulish chief collaborating with the Romans who challenges Vitalstatistix for leadership. Ceramix is a pun on Muhammad Ali's birth name, Cassius Clay, and like him is a skilled boxer
Charles Aznavour — as a singing pirate in Asterix and the Chieftain's Daughter.
Charles Laughton — as the villainous prefect Surplus Dairiprodus in Asterix and the Golden Sickle.
Charlton Heston (as Ben Hur) can be seen arguing with another driver in Asterix and the Golden Sickle.
 Cartoon characters — Hoodunnit from Asterix and the Magic Carpet is the cousin of Iznogoud, another cartoon character created by Goscinny. In Asterix and the Falling Sky the alien Toon resembles a purple Mickey Mouse. His home planet (Tadsilweny) is an anagram of Walt Disney.
Eddy Merckx – as a messenger in Asterix in Belgium.
Goscinny and Uderzo have cameo appearances in many books including Asterix in Britain, Obelix and Co. and The Missing Scroll.
Mahatma Gandhi – As Watzisnehm the Fakir in Asterix and the Magic Carpet.
Guy Lux — As a gameshow host in the Mansions of the Gods.
Jacques Chirac — The economist who buys Obelix's menhirs in Obelix and Co.
Jean Graton – As a driver in "the great ox-cart race, the Suindinum 24 hours" (in later translations "The Suindinum 500") in Asterix and the Golden Sickle.
Jean Richard — As a lion tamer in Asterix and the Laurel Wreath
Julian Assange – As Confoundtheirpolitix, a publisher of Caesar's secrets in Asterix and the Missing Scroll
Kirk Douglas — in "Asterix and Obelix All at Sea" as Spartakis the Greek, leader of a multi-national, multi-cultural band of mutinous slaves who've escaped after commandeering Caesar's personal galley.
Laurence Olivier and Alec Guinness — As actors in Asterix and the Cauldron.
Lino Ventura — Appears as the centurion in Asterix and the Roman Agent.
Luciano Pavarotti — Appears as an innkeeper in Asterix and the Chariot Race.
Napoleon — as the Corsican chief Boneywasawarriorwayayix (Ocatarinetabellatchitchix in the original French). Alternatively, this may also be a caricature of Ricardo Montalbán. Also appears in Asterix and the Big Fight (differently) as one of Psychoanalytix's patients.
Otto von Bismarck — As the Goth chieftain Metric.
Peter Ustinov — As Poisonus Fungus the Prefect of Lugdunum in Asterix and the Banquet
Pierre Tchernia — Pierre Tchernia has made various cameos throughout the books, always as a Roman Legionary. He first appears in Asterix the Legionary as one of the generals discussing tactics with Caesar, then Asterix in Corsica as Centurion Hippopotamus, the commanding officer of Totorum. Later, he appears in Obelix & Co. as a drunk legionary who has to be carried out of the forfeited camp by caricatures of Goscinny and Uderzo. He appears again as a legionary in Asterix and Caesar's Gift and Asterix in Belgium.
Jean Gabin — Appears as the Roman governor of Judaea Pontius Pilate (called Pontius Pirate in the comics) in Asterix and the Black Gold. In reality the historical Pontius Pilate wasn't even born at the time Asterix is set.
Raimu — As a bartender in Asterix and the Banquet.
Sean Connery — As the spy Dubbelosix (an obvious parody of James Bond) in Asterix and the Black Gold.
Sigmund Freud — As Psychoanalytix the druid in Asterix and the Big Fight. He runs a mental health clinic with patients including a shy barbarian, a man who thinks he's a wild boar and Napoleon Bonaparte.
Silvio Berlusconi — Appears as the owner of a garum business  in Asterix and the Chariot Race.
Stan Laurel and Oliver Hardy — As legionaries in Obelix and Co.
Sylvie Uderzo — As Orthopaedix's young daughter Influenza in Asterix and Caesar's Gift.
Tintin — Gastronomix the Belgian has Tintin's haircut in Asterix the Legionary.
Thomson and Thompson — Identical twin detectives from The Adventures of Tintin. They appear in Asterix in Belgium.
Harold Wilson (with a red wig and moustache) appears in Asterix in Britain as the chieftain Mykingdomforanos. Also there is a character in Asterix and the Great Crossing, known as Håråldwilssen.
Valéry Giscard d'Estaing — as a Roman tax collector.
Tibet (cartoonist) aka Gilbert Gascard — as the Roman Quaestor Vexatius Sinusitus in Asterix in Switzerland.
The volume, Asterix and the Missing Scroll has several caricatures. Caesar's publisher Libellus Blockbustus resembles French advertising magnate Jacques Seguela, Film director Alfred Hitchcock is caricatured as an unnamed falconer among the entourage of Libellus Blockbustus. French actor Jean Reno appears as a soldier in Libellus Blockbustus's special unit tasked to retrieve the scroll. French journalist Franz-Olivier Giesbert is caricatured as the white-haired critic of Mundus. The newsmonger character Confoundtheirpolitix was inspired by and resembles Julian Assange.
Various pop stars — The Beatles appear in Asterix in Britain while the Rolling Menhirs and Elvis Preslix are mentioned in Asterix and the Normans. In addition, Cacofonix's hairstyle is based on Elvis's.

References

External links
 

Αστεριξ Asterix
 
Lists of comics characters